Kim Kyung-mook (born 19 February 1965) is a South Korean para table tennis player. He has medalled at every Paralympic Games from 1992 to 2016, for a total of four gold, three silver, and six bronze medals.

While climbing in 1985, he incurred a spinal injury. He began playing table tennis in 1988.

References

1965 births
Living people
Table tennis players at the 1992 Summer Paralympics
Table tennis players at the 1996 Summer Paralympics
Table tennis players at the 2000 Summer Paralympics
Table tennis players at the 2004 Summer Paralympics
Table tennis players at the 2008 Summer Paralympics
Table tennis players at the 2012 Summer Paralympics
Table tennis players at the 2016 Summer Paralympics
Medalists at the 1992 Summer Paralympics
Medalists at the 1996 Summer Paralympics
Medalists at the 2000 Summer Paralympics
Medalists at the 2004 Summer Paralympics
Medalists at the 2008 Summer Paralympics
Medalists at the 2012 Summer Paralympics
Medalists at the 2016 Summer Paralympics
South Korean male table tennis players
Paralympic bronze medalists for South Korea
Paralympic silver medalists for South Korea
Paralympic gold medalists for South Korea
Paralympic table tennis players of South Korea
Paralympic medalists in table tennis
Sportspeople from North Chungcheong Province
People from Cheongju
People with paraplegia
21st-century South Korean people